South Murderkill Hundred is a hundred in Kent County, Delaware, United States. South Murderkill Hundred was formed in 1855 from Murderkill Hundred. Its primary community is Felton.

See also
 Murderkill/Motherkiln Friends Meeting
 North Murderkill Hundred

References

Hundreds in Kent County, Delaware